Tracy Nicole Chapman is an American actress, best known for originating the role of Shenzi in the Broadway production of The Lion King. She also appeared on Broadway in The Who's Tommy, Caroline, or Change, and Cy Coleman's The Life. Other theatre credits include the Broadway revivals of How to Succeed in Business Without Really Trying, The Music Man, and Into the Woods. She also toured with Jelly's Last Jam, Dreamgirls, and Once On This Island.

References

External links
 
 

American stage actresses
Living people
Place of birth missing (living people)
Year of birth missing (living people)
20th-century American actresses
21st-century American women